Django Django is the debut album by British art rock band Django Django. The album was released on 30 January 2012 in the United Kingdom via Because Music, and charted on the UK Albums Chart at #33. In 2014 it was awarded a gold certification from the Independent Music Companies Association, which indicated sales of at least 75,000 copies throughout Europe.

The album was nominated for the 2012 Mercury Music Prize. It was certified gold by the UPFI in 2012, and then platinum in 2013.

Critical reception

Django Django holds a score of 80 out of 100 on review aggregate site Metacritic, indicating "generally favorable reviews". The Guardian reviewer Michael Hann praised the album's "top-notch" songwriting and "updated psychedelia that beguiles and delights", concluding that "surely this debut won't be topped in 2012".

The track "WOR" has been recently used in a Toyota Australia advertisement for the 2019 Toyota CH-R Next Gen Turbo.

The album was listed at number 26 on Rolling Stones list of the top 50 albums of 2012, with the magazine writing: "Drummer-producer David Maclean is the MVP, building trippy tracks around indelible grooves."

The album was also included in the book 1001 Albums You Must Hear Before You Die.

The song "Waveforms" was used in the 2013 video game, Grand Theft Auto V on the "Worldwide FM" radio station.

Track listing
 "Introduction" – 2:12
 "Hail Bop" – 4:03
 "Default" – 3:07
 "Firewater" – 4:49
 "Waveforms" – 4:26
 "Zumm Zumm" – 5:19
 "Hand of Man" – 2:36
 "Love's Dart" – 3.49
 "WOR" – 4:49
 "Storm" – 3:14
 "Life's a Beach" – 3:05
 "Skies Over Cairo" – 3:32
 "Silver Rays" – 3.50

Personnel 
Vincent Neff – lead vocals, guitars
Jim Nixon – bass guitar, backing vocals, keyboards
Tommy Grace – keyboards, backing vocals, drum programming, samples
Dave Maclean – drums, percussion, drum programming

Hi Djinx! Django Django Remixed
Hi Djinx! Django Django Remixed is a remix album with the same exact track listing as Django Django excluding the introduction. It was given away for free with purchase of the original album in certain stores as well as being sold as a download and CD. Remixers include Tom Furse, Adrian Sherwood, and Steve Mason.

Certifications

References

2012 debut albums
Django Django albums
Because Music albums
Art rock albums by English artists
Experimental pop albums